George Lopez, commonly referred to as The George Lopez Show, is an American sitcom created by George Lopez, Bruce Helford and Robert Borden, which originally aired for six seasons, consisting of 120 episodes, on ABC from March 27, 2002, to May 8, 2007. Helford and Borden also serve as showrunners and are executive producers. The show stars the titular comedian George Lopez, who plays a fictionalized version of himself, featuring his life at work and his family life in Los Angeles, California.

Series synopsis 

The comedy revolves around a fictionalized portrayal of Lopez who works at the Powers Brothers aviation factory. George raises daughter Carmen and dyslexic son Max with his wife Angie, after surviving a miserable, dysfunctional childhood at the hands of his neglectful alcoholic mother Benny, who is portrayed as selfish and cold-hearted. Other characters include Angie's indulgent father, wealthy doctor Vic Palmero, who is not very fond of George; and George's best childhood friend Ernie Cardenas, noted for his socially-awkward behavior and unsuccessful attempts at dating. After Carmen's departure from the series, Angie's overindulged niece Veronica moved in, laden with a large trust fund that is entrusted to George's care.

Multiple storylines in the series are established through the unveiling of a secret guarded by Benny throughout George's whole childhood, most notably the discovery that his father Manny is still alive after Benny had convinced George that he died. Throughout much of the series George tries to locate his father; when Manny is finally introduced, he turns out to be a nasty but successful businessman who is now married to a woman named Lydia with whom he has more children. Manny's personality was commonly depicted as being abusive toward his son and former wife in his few appearances before he dies of kidney disease. Much to George's fury, Manny has prohibited his son's family from attending his funeral in protection of his reputation.

Episodes

Characters

Production

Conception 
Comedian George Lopez had been performing standup throughout the early 1990s, expressing interest in having his own comedy television show like Seinfeld. Lopez was only willing to do a show if it meant that the roles were not demeaning to Latinos, vowing never to play a murderer, drug dealer or gang member. With an absence of TV deals, he continued to perform standup through the 1990s and into the 2000s. In August 2000, after being given one of Lopez's comedy albums to listen to, actress Sandra Bullock saw Lopez perform live at the Brea Improv Comedy Club. Bullock had been interested in developing a TV show with a Latino storyline, being concerned about the lack of visibility for Latinos on American television. Bullock approached Lopez backstage after the show and made her pitch to produce and star in a situational comedy centered around the comedian.

Though Bullock had connections through Hollywood, The George Lopez Show was not an easy sell. Bullock sought the help of Bruce Helford (who created The Drew Carey Show and had been a head writer for Roseanne), and, due to his history with ABC on those shows, became a co-creator and executive producer of Lopez's show. Bullock, Helford, and two of the show's other executive producers met with ABC executives later that month, and the network tested the show with 4 episodes, before committing to 13 episodes the following fall and eventually adding an additional 9. Lopez was given full starring, creator, producer and writer credits for the show. The George Lopez Show was seen as an attempt from ABC to diversify their programming, while still appealing to the widest possible audience. ABC executives were hopeful that Lopez's humor and relatability would draw a large family audience, focusing on marketing the series as much as possible. The network bought promotional time for the show on Spanish-language networks, and took out full-page ads in some magazines.

Lopez drew much of the material for the show from his own life experiences, especially his upbringing in the San Fernando Valley. Upon the series debut, Lopez became one of the few Latinos to star in a television comedy series, following in the footsteps of Desi Arnaz, Freddie Prinze, and John Leguizamo.

Casting 
For the first five seasons, the show had an all-Latino cast with the exception of Albanian American actress Masiela Lusha, who played George's daughter Carmen. During the show's fifth season, Aimee Garcia was cast as George's niece, Veronica.

Music 
The show's theme song is "Low Rider", performed by War. The theme plays in the opening credits and was present when the show aired on ABC as well as syndication, but was replaced in the DVD releases of all seasons except 1 episode due to licensing costs. At the 9th ALMA Awards in 2007, George Lopez called the song the "Chicano National Anthem".

Cancellation 

The series finale aired on May 8, 2007, after the show was canceled by ABC. According to Lopez, ABC prime-time entertainment president Steve McPherson called him over the weekend and explained that the network would lose money if the show was picked up again, and that it wasn't doing well financially. Lopez stated that the explanation was "painful to hear," noting that the show had four different time slots in only five years and had to constantly compete against shows like American Idol, yet the final season of the show was still able to outperform a comedy series that was renewed by ABC: Notes from the Underbelly. Lopez said that ABC "dealt with us from the bottom of the deck" and that it was "hard to take after what was a good run."

Lopez attributed the cancellation in part to the fact that the show was not produced directly by ABC Studios, but instead by Warner Bros. Television. Lopez also criticized ABC's decision to approve the show Cavemen, being perplexed at the circumstances: "So a Chicano can't be on TV, but a caveman can?" According to Lopez, 170 staff members who worked on the show lost their jobs. Lopez explained that he "took the five years of good, and I did a lot with the good. My popularity, I was involved in charities, I overcame my illness, all on TV. I shared all of that with America—every secret I had... Every emotion. Everything was open to the show. And what happens?"

Distribution 

The series is produced by Fortis Productions and Mohawk Productions in association with Warner Bros. Television.

Broadcast and syndication 
The show entered syndication one month after the series finale on ABC, and is distributed by Warner Bros. Television Distribution. The show aired in broadcast syndication on independent stations, and affiliates of Fox, The CW and MyNetworkTV as well as The CW Plus stations in the United States from 2007 to 2011 and on Telelatino in Canada. The show moved to ION Television on Thursday, Sept. 29, 2011. The series joined TBS on September 28, 2020.

On March 8, 2007, it was announced that George Lopez would join the Nick at Nite lineup. It first aired on Nick at Nite on September 10, 2007—it was the most current non-original show to air on Nick at Nite (until it was announced that Everybody Hates Chris would join the lineup, followed by The Goldbergs and Mom and currently Young Sheldon). To this date, it continues to be their highest-rated series and one of cable's best for an off-network sitcom. On September 8, 2020, the show was removed from syndication on Nick at Nite, ending its almost 13-year run on the network. The series was also shown on Paramount Global sister networks MTV Tres and TV Land.

Never a major hit in primetime, the show became an unexpected success in syndication. Many markets also moved the show from overnight timeslots to more desirable ones.

Episodes from the first four seasons of George Lopez do not use those respective seasons' opening titles, the season five version is used instead (this is evident as Emiliano Diez is credited in the sequence, which is slightly longer than how they were originally broadcast on ABC, though there is also a short version also used in syndication that also differs from the original short opening credits that does not credit him for seasons 1–3, even though Diez did not make his first guest appearance until season two and did not become a cast regular until season four); the final two seasons use those seasons' appropriate versions of the opening credits.

Home media
On April 17, 2007, Warner Home Video released seasons 1 and 2 on DVD in Region 1. After over six years since the release of the first and second seasons, Warner Home Video released the third season on July 16, 2013. The fourth season was released on June 23, 2015. The fifth season was released on August 18, 2015. The sixth and final season was released on November 24, 2015.

Online media 
The complete series was also published in high definition on the iTunes Store and Amazon Video. The show's theme song "Low Rider" is intact in these releases. The series became available to stream on Peacock on July 15, 2020.

Reception

Ratings

Accolades

Notes

References

External links 

 
 Old website at the Internet Archive
 

2000s American sitcoms
2002 American television series debuts
2007 American television series endings
American Broadcasting Company original programming
Dyslexia in fiction
English-language television shows
Television series by Warner Bros. Television Studios
Television shows set in Los Angeles
TGIF (TV programming block)
Television series created by Bruce Helford
Television series by Mohawk Productions
Television series about families
Latino sitcoms